Martel is an unincorporated community in central Tully Township, Marion County, Ohio, United States.  it had a post office with the ZIP code 43335.  After its post office was closed, the community was made part of the Caledonia ZIP code area.

History
Martel was laid out in 1881.  A post office called Martel was established in 1883, and remained in operation until 1996. Besides the post office, Martel had a railroad station. Martel also appears on some maps as Baker, Three Locusts, and Tully City.

References

Unincorporated communities in Marion County, Ohio
Unincorporated communities in Ohio